The 13th Golden Globe Awards, honoring the best in film for 1955 films, were held on February 23, 1956.

Winners

Best Motion Picture - Drama
 East of Eden directed by Elia Kazan

Best Motion Picture - Comedy or Musical
 Guys and Dolls directed by Joseph L. Mankiewicz

Best Performance by an Actor in a Motion Picture - Drama
 Ernest Borgnine - Marty

Best Performance by an Actress in a Motion Picture - Drama
 Anna Magnani - The Rose Tattoo

Best Performance by an Actor in a Motion Picture - Comedy or Musical
 Tom Ewell - The Seven Year Itch

Best Performance by an Actress in a Motion Picture - Comedy or Musical
 Jean Simmons - Guys and Dolls

Best Performance by an Actor in a Supporting Role in a Motion Picture
 Arthur Kennedy -  Trial

Best Performance by an Actress in a Supporting Role in a Motion Picture
 Marisa Pavan - The Rose Tattoo

Best Director - Motion Picture
 Joshua Logan - Picnic

Best Foreign Language Film
Curvas peligrosas (Dangerous Curves) from Mexico

 Eyes of Children from Japan 

 Sons, Mothers, and a General from West Germany

 Stella from Greece 

 The Word from Denmark

Henrietta Award (World Film Favorites) Male
 Marlon Brando

Henrietta Award (World Film Favorites) Female
 Grace Kelly

Special Achievement Award
 James Dean Award given posthumously for Best Dramatic Actor.

Cecil B. DeMille Award
  Jack L. Warner

Best Motion Picture - Outdoor Drama
 Wichita

Television Achievement
 Desi Arnaz for American Comedy

 Dinah Shore for Walt Disney anthology television series episode Davy Crockett.

Promoting International Understanding
 Love Is a Many-Splendored Thing- directed by  Henry King

New Star of the Year Actor
(Two way tie)

 Ray Danton in I'll Cry Tomorrow

 Russ Tamblyn in Hit the Deck

New Star of the Year Actress
(Three way tie)

 Anita Ekberg in Blood Alley

 Victoria Shaw in The Eddy Duchin Story

 Dana Wynter in The View from Pompey's Head

Hollywood Citizenship Award
 Esther Williams

References

013
1955 film awards
1955 television awards
1955 awards in the United States
February 1956 events in the United States